Andreas Pitsillides (born 9 June 1977) is a Cypriot theologian, politician, party member of DISY and former Member of the European Parliament.

Since 2020, he has been a Chaser in the Cypriot version of The Chase quiz show.

References

External links
 Biography

1977 births
Living people
MEPs for Cyprus 2009–2014
Democratic Rally MEPs
Greek Cypriot people
Cypriot theologians